Jawi may refer to:

People and languages
 Jawi dialect, a nearly extinct Australian aboriginal language
 Jawi people, an Australian Aboriginal people of the Kimberley coast of Western Australia, who speak or spoke the Jawi dialect
 Jawi, a Javanese Krama (polite Javanese) word to refer to Java Island or Javanese people; see 
 Jawi script, an Arabic script developed for writing Malay and other languages in Southeast Asia

Places
 Jawi (woreda), a woreda or district in the Amhara Region of Ethiopia
 Jawi, Penang, a town in the state of Penang, Malaysia
 Jawi temple, a 13th-century syncretic Hindu-Buddhist temple in East Java, Indonesia

Language and nationality disambiguation pages

th:อักษรยาวี